The Haßberge are a hill range, up to , north of the river Main in Lower Franconia in the German state of Bavaria. The hills are in the county of Bamberg and divided by the Main valley from their sister hills, the Steigerwald. Both forested hill ranges fall steeply down to the Main. Between the Ebelsbach and Haßfurt the river cuts through the hills in a wide gap, creating an easy route between the Upper Main and the fertile Middle Main region.

The Haßberge are a central part of the Haßberge Nature Park, whose extensive mixed forest is criss-crossed by numerous footpaths. The nature park reaches from the former Inner German Border near Bad Königshofen to the Main near Hallstadt. On the far side of the Main is the Steigerwald Nature Park.

The Haßberge region not only covers the actual, clearly defined hills, but also their western foreland and parts of the Itz-Baunach hills or Zeilberge to the east.

The region is unusually rich in historic castles and palaces, of which over 40 survive either as ruins or are still lived in. Several once heavily fortified towns at the edge of the range still have historic centres.

Haßberge Park and the modern county of Haßberge are named after the hills.

See also 
 Alte Burg (Altenstein), the "Old Castle" at Altenstein

References 

Landforms of Bavaria
Hill ranges of Bavaria